The men's discus throw event was part of the track and field athletics programme at the 1920 Summer Olympics. The competition was held on Saturday, August 21, 1920, and on Sunday, August 22, 1920. 17 discus throwers from eight nations competed. No nation had more than 4 athletes, suggesting the limit had been reduced from the 12 maximum in force in 1908 and 1912. The event was won by Elmer Niklander of Finland, the nation's second consecutive victory in the men's discus throw. Armas Taipale, the winner in 1912, took silver to become the second man to win multiple medals in the event. Gus Pope took bronze, continuing the American streak of podium appearances at all six discus competitions to date.

Background

This was the sixth appearance of the event, which is one of 12 athletics events to have been held at every Summer Olympics. Returning competitors from 1912 included defending champion Armas Taipale and fourth-place finisher Elmer Niklander, both of Finland. Taipale had twice beaten the world record, though the IAAF did not acknowledge those throws.

Belgium and Czechoslovakia each made their debut in the men's discus throw. The United States made its sixth appearance, having competed in every edition of the Olympic men's discus throw to date. Greece missed the event for the first time.

Competition format

The competition continued to use the single, divided-final format in use since 1896. Each athlete received three throws, with the top six receiving an additional three throws.

Records

These were the standing world and Olympic records (in metres) prior to the 1920 Summer Olympics.

No new world or Olympic records were set during the competition.

Schedule

Results

The best six discus throwers qualified for the final.

References

Sources
 
 

Discus throw
Discus throw at the Olympics